Lumen is a Russian rock band from Ufa. It has released seven studio albums to date.

The band considers February 12, 1998 as its birthday because on that date it performed as "Lumen" for the first time. The band's earlier works have an alternative rock sound with a strong influence of punk. However, they took a heavier approach on later releases. The lyrics are usually written by singer and frontman Rustem "Tem" Bulatov. The band's songs are inspired by diverse controversial events and issues which take place inside and outside Russia, as well as personal struggles.

Biography

1996–2000
Rustem Bulatov (vocals), Igor Mamaev (guitar) and Denis Shakhanov (drums) had been jamming together with different bass players. Finally, Yevgeni Ognev was accepted as a full-time member. During this period, the band did not have a constant name and was playing cover versions of Grazhdanskaya Oborona and Kino songs, as well as writing their first original material.

2001
In 2001, Lumen had a headline performance at Navigator Club in their hometown. The show was later released as their first live album.

2002
The major part of the year was spent in the studio working on the debut full-length record. One of the songs entitled "Sid & Nancy" was released as a radio single which later turned out to be successful. It was amongst the 13 most charting songs of Nashe Radio for about two months. It also helped the band to get a spot at the big festival organized by the same radio. The musicians consider this show as one of the most important in their careers as well as the turning point for the whole band.

2003
The band released their debut album called Без консервантов ("No Preservatives Added") which contains 18 songs, including their breakthrough single "Sid & Nancy". The song called "Urmanga" features the lyrics written in Bashkir language. This remains their only song performed in another language apart from Russian.

2004
In 2004, the band began to work with Vadim Bazeev, who today is a director and producer of the group. They also published thealbum "Три пути (Three Ways), their second studio work. After the album release they started their first tour of twenty cities in Russia.

2005
At the beginning of the year the band published their second live album, Одной крови (Same Blood). This album included two new songs, "Не спеши" (Don't hurry up) and "Благовещенск (02)" (Blagoveshchensk (02)). In October of that year they published their third studio album, Свобода (Freedom). The sound of the group began to be tougher, and some songs are very socially acute. The lyrics of the song "Государство (State)" are still actual – "It's kind of democracy here but it's actually an empire. I love my country so much, but I hate the State!"

2006-present
In August 2014, the band cancelled their concert in a festival in Ukraine after it found out that the proceeds of the festival would be used to support the Azov Battalion of the Ukrainian army; that at the time fought in the War in Donbass.

Conclusion
In ten years, Lumen gradually became the most famous Russian alternative band. In October 2007, the band won two prizes at the RAMP Awards from the main alternative music channel in Russia "A-One", they were the laureate of nominations "Best band of 2007" and "Best album of 2007". In October 2008, Lumen won the "Band of the Year" prize at the Russian Alternative Music Prize. Their first radio hit, "Sid and Nancy", was released in 2002 and became a hymn for a huge number of teenagers who found their own ego in Lumen's lyrics and realised that they were soul-mates. Then two of their songs "C4" and "Skolko" ("How much?") found the same destiny as "Sid and Nancy". The song "Gosudarstvo" ("The State"), featuring lyrics that are very critical of the Russian political situation, became the most audience-demanded song on A-One.

Members
 Rustem Bulatov (Tem) – vocals, sampler 
 Igor Mamaev (Garik) – guitar, backing vocal
 Yevgeni Trishin (Shmel) – bass, guitar, keyboards
 Denis Shakhanov (Dan) – drums

Past member
 Yevgeni Ognev (John) – bass, left the group in March 2007

Albums

Studio albums

Live albums
 Live in Navigator club (2002)
 Одной крови (Same Blood) (2005)
 Дыши (Breathe) (2006)
 Буря (Tempest) (2007)
 Лабиринт (Labyrinth) (2011)

DVDs
 Дыши (Breathe) (2006)
 Буря (Tempest) (2007)
 Record МИРА (2010) – documentary film about recording the album Мир 
 Live at Teleclub (Ekaterinburg) (2011)

Compilation albums
 The Best (2007)

Singles
 "Пассатижи" (Pliers) (2003, maxi-single)
 "TV No More" (2008, internet single)

Awards

Russian Alternative Music Prize
The RAMP Awards are awarded annually by the A-One TV channel.
 Best Artist – 2007, 2008
 Best Album – 2007 (Pravda?), 2009 (Mir)

Fuzz Awards
The Fuzz Awards is an annual Russian awards ceremony established in 1997 by rock music magazine of Fuzz.
 Best New Artist – 2007
 Best Album – 2008 (Pravda?)

ZD Awards
The ZD Awards are awarded annually by the Moskovsky Komsomolets.
 Best Alternative Act – 2009

References

External links
 Official site
 Lumen on Last.fm 
 "Lumen: Forward-Looking Politics, Old-School Rhetoric" (in English) – farfrommoscow.com
 Interview with Lumen in Murmansk (in Russian)
 
 Music videos on YouTube
 Excerpts from songs

Russian rock music groups
Russian alternative rock groups
Musical groups established in 1998